Mutant is the second studio album by Venezuelan electronic music producer Arca. It was released on 20 November 2015 via Mute. 

According to Arca, the album chronicles, "sensuality and impulsiveness as escape routes out of rigidity". It has been labeled as a noise, trap, industrial and experimental album. To promote Mutant, four singles were released. Upon release, the album was critically acclaimed and was ranked as Tiny Mix Tapes' favorite album of 2015.

Critical reception

Mutant received widespread acclaim from contemporary music critics. At Metacritic, which assigns a normalized rating out of 100 to reviews from mainstream critics, the album received an average score of 81, based on 21 reviews, which indicates "universal acclaim".

Mark Richardson of Pitchfork gave the album a very positive review, stating, "Compared to Xen, Mutant feels less composed and less indebted to classical music. With many tracks on the former album you could squint a little bit and imagine them being performed by a daring new music ensemble, à la Aphex Twin with Alarm Will Sound. But Mutant leans toward soundscape, avoiding proper songs." Richardson concludes, "On Mutant, Ghersi turns a fixation on porousness and instability into a kind of spiritual pursuit."

Writing for Exclaim!, Daryl Keating said Mutant "is an album that is eventually rewarding, but only to those who are determined to follow its scattered pathway to the satisfying, aggregate end."

Track listing

Personnel
Songwriter/producer – Alejandra Ghersi
Artwork – Jesse Kanda
Mastered By – Matt Colton

Charts

References

2015 albums
Mute Records albums
Albums produced by Arca (musician)
Arca (musician) albums
Glitch (music) albums
Dubstep albums
Industrial albums
Ambient albums
World music albums